Beijing Shougang Co., Ltd. is a listed Chinese steel manufacturer. It also a subsidiary of Shougang Group. The shares of Beijing Shougang float in the Shenzhen Stock Exchange.

Beijing Shougang was a constituent of SZSE 1000 Index (as well as sub-index SZSE 700 Index) but not in SZSE Component Index, making the company was ranked between the 501st to 1,000th by free float adjusted market capitalization.

Business overview
The company operated Shougang Group's first steel plant in Shijingshan District. The plant closed in 2009. On 23 April 2015 Beijing Shougang Limited acquired 51% stake of "Jingtang United Iron and Steel" from the parent company, a steel plant in Caofeidian District, Tangshan, Hebei Province, for 9.718 billion RMB cash, plus the 100% stake of a division in Guizhou Province.

Jingtang United Iron and Steel
Shougang Jingtang United Iron & Steel Co., Ltd. was a joint venture between Shougang Group (51%) and Tangsteel Group (49%). The steel plant was built on modern technology as well as acquiring equipment from overseas, such as from Siemens. It was mentioned in the 11th Five-year plan. In 2010 Tangsteel Group sold the minority interests to Shougang Group. After a net loss of 3.65 billion RMB and 1.76 billion RMB in 2012 and 2013 respectively, the company made a net profit of 124 million RMB in 2014.

In 2015 51% stake of the steel plant was injected to Shougang Group's listed subsidiary Beijing Shougang Co., Ltd., which the subsidiary paid the parent company mostly in cash. Shougang Group retained 49% stake directly.

Equity investments

 BAIC Motor (13.54%)

References

External links
 

Companies listed on the Shenzhen Stock Exchange
Chinese companies established in 1999
Steel companies of China
Companies owned by the provincial government of China
Manufacturing companies based in Beijing
Manufacturing companies established in 1999